The 2014 All-Africa Korfball Championship was held in Zambia from August 6 to August 8, with 4 national teams in competition.

The tournament also served as an African qualifier for the 2015 Korfball World Championship, with the top nation qualifying for the world championship.

Group stage
The Group Stage took place on the 6th and 7 August.

|}

Finals
The Finals took place on the 8th of August.

1st place match
 21 - 11 

3rd place match
 11 - 12G 

Key: G denotes win by golden goal.

Final standing

References 

All-Africa Korfball Championship
International sports competitions hosted by Zambia
Sport in Lusaka
All-Africa Korfball Championship
All-Africa Championship
Korfball in Zambia
Korfball Championship